The COVID-19 pandemic in the Philippines has resulted in, as of ,  reported cases, resulting in  reported deaths, the fifth-highest in Southeast Asia, behind Vietnam, Indonesia, Malaysia, and Thailand. The first case in the Philippines was identified on January 30, 2020, and involved a 38-year-old Chinese woman who was confined at San Lazaro Hospital in Metro Manila. On February 1, 2020, a posthumous test result from a 44-year-old Chinese man turned out positive for the virus, making the Philippines the first country outside China to record a confirmed death from the disease.

After over a month without recording any cases, the Philippines confirmed its first local transmission on March 7, 2020. Since then, the virus has spread to the country's 81 provinces. National and local governments have been imposing community quarantines since March 15, 2020, as a measure to limit the spread of the virus. These include the Luzon-wide enhanced community quarantine (ECQ) that was implemented in March–May 2020. On March 24, President Rodrigo Duterte signed the Bayanihan to Heal as One Act, a law that granted him additional powers to handle the pandemic. This was repealed by a follow-up law, the Bayanihan to Recover as One Act, which he signed on September 11.

The Philippines had a slightly lower testing capacity than its neighbors in Southeast Asia during the first months of the pandemic in the country. COVID-19 tests had to be taken in Australia, as the Philippines lacked testing kits. By the end of January 2020, the Research Institute for Tropical Medicine (RITM) in Muntinlupa, Metro Manila began its testing operations and became the country's first testing laboratory. The DOH has since then accredited 279 laboratories that are capable of detecting the SARS-CoV-2 virus. As of September 10, 2021, 277 of these have conducted 19,742,325 tests from more than 18,551,810 unique individuals.

COVID-19 cases throughout the country started declining in February 2022, and by May 2022, the health department noted that the country was at "minimal-risk case classification" with an average of only 159 cases per day recorded from May 3 to 9. As of early June 2022, 69.4 million Filipinos have been fully vaccinated, while 14.3 million individuals received their booster shots. In August 2022, Filipino public schools reopened for in person learning for the first time in two years. As of 23 February 2023, a total of 170,545,638 vaccine doses have been administered.

Timeline

January to February 2020 
The Philippines reported its first suspected case of COVID-19 in January 2020. It involved a 5-year-old boy in Cebu, who arrived in the country on January 12 with his mother. At that time, the Philippines had no capability to conduct COVID-19 tests. The boy tested positive for "non-specific pancoronavirus assay" in the RITM. Samples from the boy were also sent to the Victorian Infectious Disease Reference Laboratory in Melbourne, Australia to determine the specific coronavirus strain. The boy tested negative for COVID-19 but several suspected cases were already reported in various parts of the country.

The RITM developed capability to conduct confirmatory tests for COVID-19 in response to the emergence of suspected COVID-19 cases. It started conducting confirmatory tests on January 30.

The first case of COVID-19 in the Philippines was confirmed on the same day. The diagnosed patient was a 38-year-old Chinese woman from Wuhan, who had arrived in Manila from Hong Kong on January 21. She was admitted to the San Lazaro Hospital in Manila on January 25 after she sought a consultation due to a mild cough. At the time of the confirmation announcement, the Chinese woman was already asymptomatic.

The second case was confirmed on February 2, a 44-year-old Chinese male who was the companion of the first case. His death on February 1 was the first recorded outside China. He was coinfected with influenza and Streptococcus pneumoniae.

On February 5, the DOH confirmed a third case in a 60-year-old Chinese woman who flew into Cebu City from Hong Kong on January 20 before she traveled to Bohol where she consulted a doctor at a private hospital on January 22, due to fever and rhinitis. Samples taken from the patient on January 24 returned a negative result, but the DOH was notified on February 3 that samples taken from the patient on January 23 tested positive for the virus. The patient upon recovery on January 31 was allowed to go home to China.

March 2020 

After a month of reporting no new cases, on March 6, the DOH announced two cases consisting of two Filipinos. One was a 48-year-old man with a travel history in Japan that returned on February 25 and reported symptoms on March 3. The other was a 60-year-old man with a history of hypertension and diabetes who experienced symptoms on February 25 and was admitted to a hospital on March 1 when he experienced pneumonia. He had last visited a Muslim prayer hall in San Juan. The DOH confirmed that the fifth case had no travel history outside the Philippines and is, therefore, the first case of local transmission. A sixth case was later confirmed, that of a 59-year-old woman who is the wife of the fifth case. Since then, the Department of Health recorded a continuous increase in the number of COVID-19 cases in the country.

Cases abroad involving foreigners with travel history in the Philippines were reported in early March 2020. The first three recorded cases involving an Australian, a Japanese, and a Taiwanese national had a history of visiting the Philippines in February 2020. Though it was unconfirmed whether or not they had contracted the virus while in the Philippines, speculations arose on undetected local transmissions in the country due to prior confirmation of the Philippines' first case of local transmission.

Retrospective studies have been made to determine the strain of virus responsible for causing the community outbreak of COVID-19 in the Philippines since March 2020. In May 2020, Edsel Salvaña, director of the Institute of Molecular Biology and Biotechnology and member of the IATF-EID, said that the strain responsible for the COVID-19 outbreak in the country that started in March 2020 is closely related to the strain affecting India at the time. The virus strain's family tree is said by Salvaña to have appeared in China and Australia. In a July 2020 webinar led by Cynthia Saloma, executive director of the UP Philippine Genome Center two hypotheses was presented regarding the source of the March 2020 outbreak in the Philippines. Genetic sequence analysis of samples collected from Philippine General Hospital patients from March 22–28 suggest that there are at least two sources of viral transmission in the Philippines; China, mainly from Shanghai and from Japan specifically through repatriated Filipino seafarers of the Diamond Princess cruise ship.

Several measures were imposed to mitigate the spread of the disease in the country, including bans on travel to mainland China, Hong Kong, Macau, and South Korea. On March 7, 2020, the Department of Health (DOH) raised its "Code Red Sub-Level 1," with a recommendation to the President of the Philippines to impose a "public health emergency" authorizing the DOH to mobilize resources for the procurement of safety gear and the imposition of preventive quarantine measures. On March 9, President Rodrigo Duterte issued Proclamation No. 922, declaring the country under a state of public health emergency.

On March 12, President Duterte declared "Code Red Sub-Level 2," issuing a partial lockdown on Metro Manila for 30 days to prevent a nationwide spread of COVID-19. The lockdowns were expanded on March 16, placing the entirety of Luzon under an "enhanced community quarantine" (ECQ). Other local governments outside Luzon followed in implementing similar lockdowns. On March 17, President Duterte issued Proclamation No. 929, declaring the Philippines under a state of calamity for a tentative period of six months.

Additional facilities started to conduct confirmatory testing. On March 20, four facilities, namely the Southern Philippines Medical Center in Davao City, Vicente Sotto Memorial Medical Center in Cebu City, Baguio General Hospital and Medical Center in Benguet, and the San Lazaro Hospital in Manila (where the first case was admitted to), began conducting tests as well augmenting the RITM. Other facilities began operations as well in the following days.

On March 25, the President signed the Bayanihan to Heal as One Act, which gave him additional powers to handle the outbreak.

April to May 2020 

By April, COVID-19 had spread to all 17 regions of the Philippines, with the confirmation of a case in April 6 of a patient confined at a hospital in Surigao City who had been in the Caraga region since March 12 after traveling from Manila.

President Duterte on April 7 accepted the recommendation of the Inter-Agency Task Force for the Management of Emerging Infectious Diseases (IATF-EID) to extend the ECQ in Luzon until April 30.

On April 17, it was reported that the country had been able to bring down the viral disease' reproduction number to 0.65 from 1.5, which meant that the average number of people a person could infect decreased from more than one to less than one. Recent data at the time suggested that the country was doing better in "flattening the curve", but was warned of a "resurgence" and must ramp up mass testing in order to isolate cases and avoid further transmission of COVID-19.

Sometime in late April, local government units (LGUs) were no longer authorized to impose quarantine measures without the consent of the IATF-EID. Prior to that period, LGUs could impose such measures in coordination with the Department of the Interior and Local Government.

The ECQ in Luzon was extended until May 15 in some areas. This included Metro Manila, Calabarzon, Central Luzon (except Aurora), Pangasinan, and Benguet. ECQ measures were also extended in the provinces of Iloilo and Cebu as well as in Davao City. Other areas were downgraded or placed under general community quarantine (GCQ).

On May 14, Typhoon Vongfong (local name: Ambo) landed on Samar Island. In the Philippines, tens of thousands of people who were locked out due to lockdowns were faced with the dual threat of typhoons and viruses, forcing complex and dangerous evacuation. At each shelter in the central part of the Philippines, in order to prevent the spread of coronavirus infection, only half of the capacity was accepted, and a mask was required when evacuating. Typhoon Vongfong killed five people in the Philippines. By the time Vongfong landed, the number of confirmed infections was 11,618 and the number of deaths (due to infectious diseases) was 772 in the Philippines. Vongfong also approached Manila, but due to severe restrictions on going out of Manila, most people, including low-income people living in simple houses, could not go to shelters and were forced to wait at home.

After May 15, the Philippine government revised its quarantine classifications in correspondence to an earlier announcement that "Science and Economics will be considered for any changes of the lockdown measures." A modified enhanced community quarantine (MECQ) was applied to Metro Manila, Laguna and Cebu City, while a GCQ was raised to 41 provinces and 10 cities with moderate risk. Meanwhile, 40 provinces and 11 cities that were considered "low-risk areas" were supposed to be released from community quarantine measures, but were eventually upgraded to a "modified general community quarantine" (MGCQ) after a reportedly "honest mistake" from the national government and requests from respective LGUs.

Once again, the Philippine government revised its announcements and declared the entire country under GCQ, while Metro Manila, Laguna and Cebu City continued to implement an MECQ. This was temporary until guidelines of MGCQ for low-risk areas were finalized. The IATF-EID also reportedly considered the reclassification of provinces and cities in Central Luzon as "high-risk areas" under MECQ.

After receiving petitions from LGUs, the IATF-EID revised its quarantine policies yet again. Cebu City and Mandaue were placed under ECQ, while Metro Manila, Laguna, and Central Luzon (except for Aurora and Tarlac) were all under MECQ. The remaining parts of the country were placed under GCQ.

June to July 2020 
Quarantine measures raised throughout the country started to loosen up on June 1, with areas formerly under ECQ transitioning to a less strict quarantine. This led to a significant rise in the number of confirmed cases, as more areas implemented a GCQ.

The official start of classes in the elementary and secondary schools which customarily begin on June was postponed.

The Bayanihan to Heal as One Act expired within this month. According to the national government, the law expired on June 25, due to its sunset provision although there were interpretations that the law expired as early as June 5. Senator Sonny Angara argued that per the Constitution "emergency powers cease upon the next adjournment of Congress" and that he considers the Bayanihan Act as an emergency measure. The national government maintains that the law was to expire on June 25. Upon expiration of the law, the national government is not anymore obliged to hand out cash subsidies to families affected by community quarantine measures.

The DOH reported an overwhelmingly high number of recoveries on July 30, as the department began its "Oplan Recovery" to clear out its discrepancies with LGU counts. Under the data reconciliation of the DOH, starting from July 15, mild cases and asymptomatic cases will be recorded as recovered after 14 days from swab collection for testing. The first set of "mass recovery" was recorded on July 30 with 37,180 recoveries. From July 30, recovery reconciliations will be reported every 15 days.

August 2020 
On August 2, the Philippines surpassed the 100,000 cases mark as the country continues to report around 2,000–3,000 cases a day. The country eventually had the most COVID-19 cases in Southeast Asia when it finally breached Indonesia's total number of confirmed COVID-19 cases.

A modified enhanced community quarantine (MECQ) was placed in Metro Manila, Bulacan, Cavite, Laguna, and Rizal from August 4 to 18 as a response to the petition of medical front liners requesting an ECQ in Metro Manila.

In early August, the Philippine Health Insurance Corporation (PhilHealth) became involved in a corruption scandal, and its executives were alleged to have used the pandemic as a cover-up to steal billions of pesos.

The Philippine Genome Center (PGC) had detected a new variant of the  virus originating in the Philippines. The new variant is said to be globally dominant variant than other variants of the virus at the time of detection and has been associated with the sudden increase of new cases in July.

By August 18, the DOH has identified 1,302 COVID-19 clusters throughout the country with the majority being located in Metro Manila.

September to November 2020 
On September 11, President Duterte signed Republic Act No. 11494 or the Bayanihan to Recover as One Act into law. President Duterte then extended the period of the state of calamity until September 2021, through his Proclamation No. 1021 filed on September 18.

The IATF-EID also announced on September 18 that all cemeteries, columbariums, and memorial parks nationwide will be closed from October 29 to November 4 to prevent social gatherings traditionally conducted as part of the All Saints' Day observance. This is similar to the proposal made by Metro Manila mayors few days prior.

COVID-19 has spread to all provinces in the Philippines by September 28, when Batanes recorded its first case.

December 2020 
In mid-December, a new variant of SARS-CoV-2 known as Lineage B.1.1.7 was identified in the United Kingdom and is reportedly more contagious than earlier variants of the virus. This has led to several countries to restrict or ban travel from the United Kingdom, including the Philippines. The Philippines also banned travel from 19 other nations which has reported cases of more-infectious variants of SARS-CoV-2.

The DOH announced in a briefing held in January 2021 that the U.K. variant is already in the Philippines as early as December 2020. One of the samples collected by the health department on December 10 tested positive for the variant on January 21, 2021.

January 2021 
By January 2021, the DOH is already monitoring at least two other noted mutations aside from the U.K. variant, namely the 501.V2 variant which originated from South Africa and another variant from Malaysia.

On January 5, 2021, Hong Kong reported that they detected the U.K. variant from a 30-year-old woman who arrived in the city from the Philippines on December 22, 2020, raising concerns that the strain may already be in the Philippines. The following day, a joint DOH–PGC study said that it has not detected the U.K. variant among 305 samples collected from November to December hospital admissions involving inbound travellers who have tested positive for COVID-19 upon arrival in the country.

Epidemiologist John Wong, who is part of DOH's technical advisory working group, said in a press briefing on January 6 that if Lineage B.1.1.7 establishes itself in the Philippines, the total number of cases could rise about fifteen-fold. Wong provided two scenarios which assumed there are 20,000 cases at the beginning of the month. In the first scenario, COVID-19 has a r rate of 1.1 and the U.K. variant does not reach the Philippines which project an increase of cases to 32,000 by the end of the month. In the second scenario where Lineage B.1.1.7 does indeed establish itself in the country, the projected rise of cases could go as high as 300,000 in the same time period.

On January 13, the DOH announced that the U.K. variant has been detected in the country when a 29-year-old man from Quezon City, who arrived in the country from the United Arab Emirates on January 7, tested positive for COVID-19. 13 individuals who came in contact with the man also tested positive for COVID-19 days later. On January 22, 16 new cases associated with the U.K. variant has been confirmed in several places in country including Benguet, Laguna, and Mountain Province. A case each in Benguet and Laguna had no known contact with a confirmed case or a travel history outside the country.

The Food and Drug Administration (FDA) has issued emergency use authorizations (EUA) to the Pfizer–BioNTech and the Oxford–AstraZeneca COVID-19 vaccines on January 14 and 28, respectively.

February 2021 
On February 18, the DOH in Central Visayas announced that two mutations of SARS-CoV-2 were discovered in Cebu. The mutations were classified as "mutations under investigation" and were tagged as E484K and N501Y.

March to April 2021 
The DOH announced the detection of the South African variant of SARS-CoV-2 in Pasay on March 2. On March 12, Lineage P.1, commonly known as the Brazilian variant, was detected in the country, along with a "unique" variant originating from the Philippines which was designated as the P.3 variant, which in turn related to the aforementioned variant. Japan also detected the P.3 variant on a man who traveled from the Philippines.

As a response to the recent spike in cases, the Greater Manila Area, which the government called "NCR Plus", was placed under general community quarantine (GCQ) on March 22 and was originally set to expire on April 4. It was further intensified to the stricter enhanced community quarantine (ECQ) from March 29 to April 11, when the positivity rate of the area remained high.

On March 17, the Philippine Statistics Authority (PSA) reported that there have been at least 27,967 deaths caused by, or associated with, COVID-19 by the end of 2020. 19,758 of these were tagged "COVID-19 virus not identified", while 8,209 were tagged "COVID-19 virus identified". The discrepancy between the tallies of the DOH and the PSA is due to the inclusion of probable and suspect cases in the PSA's tally. On April 26, the country surpassed 1 million cases.

May to June 2021
On May 11, the country detected its first two cases of Delta variant from India. The variant had been confirmed in two Filipino seafarers who returned in April. While the infections on Metro Manila is slowing down, COVID-19 infections is surging on other regions. Mindanao accounted for a quarter of new cases, higher than Metro Manila, showing that the pandemic has shifted to the regions far outside of the metropolitan areas. A former mayor and his brother from a nearby town were also admitted at a government hospital in the same city, as dozens of people were being treated for coronavirus outside in makeshift tents, or hooked up to oxygen tanks while sitting in their vehicles, due to the lack of hospital beds.

July 2021 
As COVID-19 surges in Indonesia, the Philippines banned travels from Indonesia amid Delta variant threat. Roque said travelers from Indonesia will be barred from entering the country from July 16 to July 31.

On July 16, the country detected 16 new cases of the highly-transmissible COVID-19 Delta variant, which has become the dominant variant in several countries. Of these, 11 are local cases. In a press briefing, Health Undersecretary Maria Rosario Vergeire said that 15 of the new detected cases had recovered while another died. Of these, 10 are females aged 14 to 79. Due to rising cases and local transmission of the Delta variant, Metro Manila, Ilocos Norte, Ilocos Sur, Davao de Oro, and Davao del Norte were placed under general community quarantine with heightened restrictions starting on July 23.

On July 29, the Department of Health (DOH) detected 97 new cases of Delta variant bringing the total number of Delta variant cases to 216. Of the newly reported cases, 88 were local cases, six are returning overseas Filipinos, while three other cases are still under verification.

August 2021 
On July 30, the government placed Metro Manila under Enhanced Community Quarantine (ECQ) starting August 6 until August 20 due to rising cases of Delta variant.

On August 5, the DOH detected 116 new cases of Delta variant bringing the total number of cases to 331. Of the additional Delta variant cases, 95 were local cases, one is a Returning Overseas Filipino (ROF) while the remaining 20 cases are being verified if they are local or ROF cses. The DOH said that among the 216 Delta variant cases reported last July 29, one case was verified to have been tested in two different laboratories so the DOH amended the previous total Delta variant cases from 216 to 215.

On the same day, President Rodrigo Duterte approved the recommendation of the IATF to place some provinces under ECQ and MECQ. Laguna, Cagayan de Oro, and Iloilo City will be under ECQ from August 6 to 15, while Lucena and the provinces of Cavite, Rizal, and Iloilo will be placed under modified enhanced community quarantine (MECQ). Batangas and Quezon, on the other hand, will be under general community quarantine (GCQ) with heightened restrictions from August 6 to 15.

On August 15, the DOH detected the country's first case of the Lambda variant. The patient is a 35-year-old female and is currently being validated as to whether she is a local or returning overseas Filipino case. The DOH said the patient was asymptomatic and tagged as recovered after undergoing the 10-day isolation period. Meanwhile, the DOH also detected 182 new cases of the Delta variant, as well as 41 new cases of the Alpha variant, 66 new cases of the Beta variant and 40 new cases of the Theta variant. Of the newly reported cases of the Delta variant, 112 cases are local, 36 are returning overseas Filipinos, and 34 are still undergoing verification. Among the 41 new Alpha cases, 38 are local, one is an ROF, and two are still being verified. Out of the 66 additional Beta cases, 56 are local and 10 cases are still undergoing verification. Among the 40 new Theta variant cases, 37 are local cases and three cases are still being verified.

On August 19, the IATF-EID approved to place Metro Manila and the province of Laguna under MECQ from August 21 to 31.

The World Health Organization released a statement on August 28, that the Delta variant is already the dominant variant of SARS-CoV-2 in the Philippines.

September 2021 
On September 1, the COVID-19 cases in the country surpassed 2 million.

On September 3, the Philippines Food and Drug Administration (FDA) approved the emergency use of Moderna's COVID-19 vaccine for minors aged 12 to 17.

The alert level system (ALS) was introduced by the government with pilot implementation of the system in Metro Manila beginning on September 16, 2021. The IATF intends to phase out the old quarantine system, which still remains in use outside Metro Manila pending the nationwide adoption of the ALS. The coverage of the ALS was expanded to include LGUs in Calabarzon, Central Visayas, and Davao regions on October 20, 2021.

October 2021 
On October 25, the DOH confirmed the presence of the B.1.1.318 variant in the country with one case reported. Along with the detection of the B.1.1.318 variant, the DOH also detected 380 more cases of the Delta variant, as well as 104 cases of Alpha variant, and 166 cases of Beta variant.

The vaccination of minors under the Philippine national vaccination also began within the month.

November 2021 
On November 8, the country detected its first ever case of the B.1.617.1 variant, formerly called Kappa variant. The patient is a 32-year-old male from Floridablanca, Pampanga who experienced a mild case and has since recovered. The alert level system's nationwide adoption was completely realized on November 22.

December 2021
The Omicron variant was first detected in the Philippines on December 15. The cases involved two travelers from Nigeria and Japan who arrived in the Philippines on November 30 and December 1 respectively. By December 28, there are four Omicron, all international travellers.

January 2022
On January 15, the DOH has confirmed that there is already a community transmission of the Omicron variant in Metro Manila. A shortage on paracetamol, other analgesic, and other drugs for flu-like symptoms was reported. The DOH and DTI maintained there is no shortage, but the latter admitted that there are some areas in the country temporarily ran out of stock due to logistical issues.

October 2022
The first confirmed cases of the Omicron XBB subvariant and XBC variant were detected in the Philippines on October 17.

Medical response

Hospital admission policy 

The DOH has issued a reminder, that Level 2 and 3 hospitals cannot deny admittance of people suspected or confirmed to have COVID-19 infection and refusal of admission is a "violation of the signed Performance Commitment and shall be dealt with by the PhilHealth accordingly". The department said that Level 2 and 3 hospitals can accommodate individuals with mild COVID-19 symptoms while individuals in a serious or critical condition may be transferred to one of the DOH's three main referral hospitals, which was increased over time to 75 designated hospitals as of April 13 with a combined bed capacity of 3,194.

On March 16, 2020, the DOH announced a revision on their protocol on hospital admission for COVID-19 positive patients. A week prior, the DOH began sending both asymptomatic patients and individuals with mild symptoms back to their homes for quarantine and continued health monitoring until they have been deemed recovered. Priority was given to high-risk patients or those with severe symptoms for hospital admission.

In mid-2021, the city of Makati initiated a program to aim to treat mild cases at home, to reduce pressure on hospitals.

Drug therapy and vaccine development

Vaccine trial participation 
The Philippines, with at least 45 other countries, joined the World Health Organization (WHO)'s Solidarity trial to study the effectivity of certain drugs in treating COVID-19 patients. Dr. Marissa Alejandria of the Philippine Society of Microbiology and Infectious Disease is the Philippines' representative in the study with Health Undersecretary Maria Rosario Vergeire as the official liaison of the DOH in the multinational study.

The Department of Science and Technology (DOST) announced that it is seeking bilateral collaboration with other countries such as China, Russia, South Korea, Taiwan, and the United Kingdom on endeavors related to the vaccine development for COVID-19.

Research on other treatments 
The Philippine Council on Health Research and Development at the DOST plans to distribute an undisclosed "functional food," while Presidential Spokesman Harry Roque also revealed that the DOST, Philippine General Hospital, and the Ateneo de Manila University, are collaborating with the Duke–NUS Medical School in Singapore to evaluate the feasibility of lauric acid from virgin coconut oil, Vitex negundo (known locally as Lagundi), and Euphorbia hirta (known locally as Tawa-tawa) as a "dietary regimen supplement" to help COVID-19 patients combat the disease. A "functional food" or "dietary regimen supplement" is described as similar to how tawa-tawa is also used as a remedy against dengue by incorporating it to the diet of diagnosed patients.

Vaccination

Supply 
The Philippine government has been negotiating with various foreign vaccine manufacturers to secure the country's COVID-19 vaccine supply. These manufacturers include Sinovac Biotech (China), Gamaleya Research Institute (Russia), Moderna (United States), and Pfizer (United States). The private sector, with government sanction, has secured at least 2.6 million vaccine doses from British-Swedish manufacturer AstraZeneca. Negotiations are also ongoing with American firm Novavax which would supply at least 10 million doses from the Serum Institute of India. The country is projected to at least 164 million doses from various manufacturers in 2021.

The procurement efforts of the national government has been a subject of various controversies. Health Secretary Francisco Duque has been alleged to "dropped the ball" in a deal with Pfizer vaccine deal which could have secured 10 million doses by as early as January 2021. Plans to secure 26 million doses from China's Sinovac has also been put into scrutiny in the Congress due to its reported efficacy rate. Late stage trials of Sinovac's vaccine  in Brazil reported an efficacy rate of only 50 percent. There were concerns within the Senate that the reported 50-percent efficacy rate of Sinovac's vaccine would not garner public trust and would be a waste of government funds. The Department of Health said that Sinovac's vaccine satisfy the World Health Organization standards of at least 50 percent efficacy rate while the FDA pointed out that Sinovac is yet to publish an official and published scientific report on their vaccines efficacy rate and that the clinical trial for the vaccine is conducted in different countries and the efficacy rate per country will vary; as low as 50 percent in Brazil and as high as above 90 percent in Turkey.

Authorization and usage 
On December 2, 2020, President Rodrigo Duterte signed an executive order allowing the Food and Drug Administration to grant emergency-use authorization (EUA) to COVID-19 vaccines and treatments. Under certain conditions, vaccines and drugs could be approved within a month instead of undergoing the usual six-month review process. Among the conditions is for a vaccine manufacturer to obtain prior EUA in its country of origin or other countries with a "mature" regulator. The FDA announced that three vaccine manufactures namely Pfizer, AstraZeneca, and Sinovac have inquired on the process of obtaining an EUA in the Philippines. On December 23, Pfizer has applied for an EUA for its vaccine.

Duterte also said in December 2020 that some members of the military already received COVID-19 vaccine from Chinese manufacturer, Sinopharm despite the vaccine not yet officially approved by the country's health authorities. A few days later, it was reported that some members of the Presidential Security Group had also received vaccine from unknown manufacturer.

Testing 

Early COVID-19 testing in the Philippines was limited to persons with a history of travel to countries with cases of local transmission and those with exposure to individuals confirmed to have COVID-19. The testing protocols were revised sometime in mid-March 2020 to give priority to the testing of any individual with severe symptoms as well as to the elderly, pregnant and immunocompromised persons with at least mild symptoms. On March 30, symptomatic healthcare workers were also considered priority for testing.

During his press briefing on May 19, Presidential Spokesperson Harry Roque said that the government's "expanded targeted testing" would target the following: "(1) all symptomatic cases, (2) all of those coming from abroad, (3) all close contacts of confirmed cases that were found through contact tracing, and (4) all of those who tested positive on rapid antibody tests." The government is also opting to test through benchmarks, by testing 1–2% of the Philippines' entire population and 10–12% of the worst affected region in the country, which is Metro Manila.

In late March 2020, some politicians and their relatives were reportedly tested for the disease despite not showing any symptoms, causing public backlash amidst a shortage of testing kits since it was against DOH guidelines to test asymptomatic individuals. The DOH responded to the public criticism by clarifying that, while there is "no policy for VIP treatment" with regard to testing for COVID-19 and that "all specimens are being processed on a first-in, first-out basis," it "extends courtesy" to front line government officials, specifically those involved in national security and public health. Some senators who were tested claim that they used rapid antibody tests not accredited by the DOH at that time.

On January 24, 2021, after receiving a go-signal from the national government, the Philippine Red Cross announced that they will start conducting COVID-19 tests using saliva samples on January 25.

Capacity 

In July 2020, there were currently 85 testing laboratories nationwide with 25,000 tests conducted daily. The country has conducted over 3 million tests as of September 2020.

On March 9, 2020, a total of 2,000 tests has been conducted at a rate of 200 to 250 people accommodated by tests per day. The testing capacity of the Philippine government has been expanded by late March 2020. As of March 23, the Research Institute for Tropical Medicine (RITM) in Muntinlupa alone can test 600 people per day, other laboratories except for the facility of San Lazaro Hospital, Manila, can do 100 tests, while the said hospital can do 50 tests per day. By March 27, the release of test results conducted at the RITM takes five to seven days due to backlog, but the institute is committed to reducing the turnaround to two to three days. The DOH announced that the country will conduct targeted mass testing on April 14, which will be administered strictly for susceptible, probable, and high-risk patients, such as health workers, expectant mothers, and patients with other medical conditions. The country's testing continuously increased, except when RITM temporarily scaled down its operations from April 20–24 after 43 of its staffs tested positive for the virus.

The Philippines has the capability to conduct mass testing, either through reverse transcription polymerase chain reaction (RT-PCR) or rapid antibody testing, given the increased number and improving capacity of the country's accredited laboratories and the procurement of more testing kits. The first localized targeted mass testing began in Valenzuela, Metro Manila on April 11. Other local government units followed suit shortly after the Inter-Agency Task Force for the Management of Emerging Infectious Diseases (IATF-EID) adopted a resolution that commences 'a national government-enabled, local government unit-led, and people-centered response' to COVID-19.

Testing kits 
The Food and Drug Administration has approved the usage of 75 PCR test kits (including one locally developed kit), 79 rapid antibody testing kits, 53 immunoassay testing kits, and 7 other testing kits as of July 30.

A locally developed PCR testing kit has been made by the National Institutes of Health at the University of the Philippines Manila. It is reportedly six times cheaper than its foreign counterparts. It was first approved for commercial use in April 2020 by the Food and Drug Administration (FDA) but some kits were recalled in May by its manufacturer, after it was found out that testing using the kits yields indeterminate results 30 percent at the time. A month later, the testing kit were re-approved after its defects were fixed.

Facilities 
Before January 30, there were no medical facilities in the country that can confirm cases of the virus. Before that date, the RITM conducted preliminary tests on suspected cases to determine if they are infected with a coronavirus but could not detect the new strain on patients. Samples from suspected cases with confirmed coronavirus infection had to be sent abroad to the Victorian Infectious Diseases Reference Laboratory in Melbourne, Australia, for confirmatory testing specifically for SARS-CoV-2.

The National Task Force for COVID-19 created the Task Force T3 (Test, Trace, and Treat) to establish public-private partnerships that would conduct mass testings. The task force cited the San Miguel Corporation as a pioneer in the move to open its COVID-19 testing laboratory to initially test all of its 70,000 employees. As of August 24, the country has 110 subnational laboratories capable of detecting SARS-CoV-2.

Backlogs 

From May 29 to June 17, 2020, the DOH had included testing backlogs on their daily case bulletin. These backlogs were referred to as "late cases" and were validated by the DOH's Epidemiology Bureau after more than four days of the release of test results. Late cases were reported alongside new cases or "fresh cases", which corresponded to the cases that were validated three days within the release of test results. This change was implemented by the health department to clarify the sudden increase of cases in the country. The then-largest single-day increase on the number of confirmed cases in the country has been accounted to the backlog in late June 2020, when 2,434 new cases were announced. 1,147 out of these cases were fresh cases and the remaining 1,287 were late cases. It surpassed the backlog in late May 2020, where 1,000 out of 1,046 cases were reported to be late cases.

Government response

Nationwide measures 
The national government declared a state of calamity over all of the Philippines on March 16, 2020, by virtue of Proclamation No. 929 signed by President Rodrigo Duterte. The declaration brings into effect for six months the following:
 price control of basic needs and commodities,
 granting interest-free loans,
 distribution of calamity funds,
 authorization of importation and receipt of donations, and
 hazard allowance for public health workers and government personnel in the fields of science and technology.

Legislative response 

Following the sharp increase of confirmed cases, President Duterte called on Congress to hold special sessions on March 23 to enact the Bayanihan to Heal as One Act upon his request, which would authorize Duterte to "reallocate, realign, and reprogram" a budget of almost  ($5.37 billion) from the estimated  ($8.55 billion) national budget approved for 2020, in response to the pandemic.

In the House of Representatives, the bill was introduced as House Bill No. 6616 with House Speaker Alan Peter Cayetano of Pateros–Taguig as its principal sponsor and was defended on the floor by Deputy Speaker Luis Raymund Villafuerte of Camarines Sur's 2nd district. In the Senate of the Philippines, the bill was introduced as Senate Bill No. 1418 with Senate President Tito Sotto and Senator Pia Cayetano as its principal sponsors.

The House version of the bill passed the House of Representatives in a 284–9 vote without abstentions, while its Senate version unanimously passed the Senate. President Duterte signed the bill into law on March 25. The law was effective for three months until June 25, owing to its sunset provision.

A legislation was proposed to replace the Bayanihan Act, dubbed as the Bayanihan to Recover as One Act or Bayanihan 2. On August 20, the bicameral committee approved a reconciled version of the bill. It was signed into law by Duterte on September 11.

Lockdowns 

The government has implemented varying levels of lockdown and/or stay-at-home orders across all the country's local government units (LGUs) characterized as "community quarantines". The strictest of these measures is designated as enhanced community quarantine (ECQ). Restrictions were imposed on various aspects of society such as mass public transportation, mass gathering, and operation of businesses.

In September 2021 the alert level system (ALS) was introduced by the government with pilot implementation of the system in Metro Manila beginning on September 16, 2021. The ALS is intended to replace the old quarantine system, which still remains in use outside Metro Manila pending the nationwide adoption of the ALS. Measures in a certain area will depend on the prevailing alert level. The ALS has five tiers with alert level 1 being the most lenient and alert level 5 being the most stringent. The coverage of the ALS was expanded to include LGUs in Calabarzon, Central Visayas, and Davao regions on October 20, 2021. By November 22, the ALS was already adopted for all LGUs.

Travel restrictions 

Travel of foreign nationals to the Philippines is banned with few exceptions since March 2020. The issuance of visas to all foreign national on March 19 was stopped and all visas already issued are voided except to those issued to families of Filipino nationals would remain valid. Three days later a travel ban was imposed on all foreign nationals, except spouses of Filipino citizens (and their children), and workers for international organizations and non-governmental organizations accredited in the country.

Foreign aid

The governments of China and the United States pledged support to the Philippine government response against COVID-19. China announced that it would be donating medical supplies including 100,000 testing kits, 100,000 surgical masks, 10,000 N95 masks, and 10,000 sets of personal protective equipment. The United States Agency for International Development also pledged $2.7 million worth of aid to help the Philippines develop adequate testing capabilities, and ensure the availability of medical supplies through the agency's "on-the-ground partners". China's aid was received on March 21, 2020.

On March 22, 2020, the DFA said that the Philippines would be receiving a donation from Singapore consisting of 3,000 testing kits and a polymerase chain reaction machine. In early April 2020, the DFA announced it received 20 units of testing kits, capable of 1,000 tests, from Brunei. The United Arab Emirates also donated medical supplies in May 2020.

On March 28, 2020, it was disclosed that some of the test kits made in China were only 40% accurate in testing for signs of the COVID-19 on an individual suspected to be infected with the disease. The test kits were donated by a private foundation.

On July 20, 2021, it was reported that the United States delivered a total of 3,240,850 one-shot Johnson & Johnson vaccines to the Philippines as part of its worldwide effort to help end COVID-19. This is the first time the Philippines has received the Johnson & Johnson vaccine – a safe, trusted and easy-to-store shot widely used in the US. Prior to the US delivery of the Johnson & Johnson vaccines, the Philippines has received more than seven million vaccine doses through the COVAX Advance Market Commitment, a global initiative run by Gavi, the Vaccine Alliance to support equitable access to COVID-19 vaccines. To date, total US government COVID-19 assistance to the Philippines amounts to over P1.38 billion ($27.5 million).

Transition to endemic phase 

In February 2022, the Philippines Department of Health began shifting towards the endemic phase of COVID-19, despite caution from the WHO that it may be too early to declare.  During a media briefing, Health Undersecretary Maria Rosario Vergeire said that the "transition to an endemic state for COVID-19 does not mean that the government would stop its interventions or even remove minimum health protocols such as masking, physical distancing and hand sanitation."  WHO Acting Philippine Representative Rajendra Yadav said that while the continued drop in the number of new cases is "encouraging," the country should be careful in moving from the "acute phase" of the pandemic.

Economic impact

Economic indicators

GDP growth and recession
The National Economic and Development Authority (NEDA) revised its economic growth outlook for the Philippines in 2020 from a 6.5% to 7.5% gross domestic product (GDP) growth registered in late 2019 to a 5.5% to 6.5% GDP growth, following the pandemic. The NEDA cited the decline in service exports, especially tourism. Moody's Analytics also reduced their GDP growth outlook for the country, from 5.9% in 2019 to 4.9% following the pandemic. Meanwhile, Nomura gave a bitter prediction of 1.6%, while the International Monetary Fund (IMF) gave an almost flat growth of 0.6% for this year before rebounding to 7.6% in 2021.

Bangko Sentral ng Pilipinas (BSP) Governor Benjamin Diokno and then-NEDA Director-General Ernesto Pernia forecast that the Philippine economy would likely enter a recession in 2020 due to the effect of the pandemic. Diokno stated that, although the first quarter is likely to grow by 3% since the Luzon-wide enhanced community quarantine only took effect near the end of the quarter, the second and third quarters would likely experience contractions in economic growth.

The Philippines' real GDP contracted by 0.2% in the first quarter of 2020, the first contraction since the fourth quarter of 1998, a year after the Asian financial crisis. The Philippines entered a technical recession, after the country's GDP contracted in by 16.5 percent in the second quarter. The country's GDP continued to contract in the following quarter periods.

The Philippines' GDP saw its worst contraction since World War II posting a growth of −9.5% for 2020 according to the Philippine Statistics Authority records from 1947. The last full-year contraction was in 1998 amidst the Asian financial crisis where the GDP grew by −0.5%. The 2020 contraction was also worse than the – 7% contraction in 1984.

The Philippine economy exited recession in the second quarter of 2021, posting a GDP growth of 11.8%.

International organizations also gave their predictions, with the Friedrich Naumann Foundation envisioning a  loss and the Europe Solidaire Sans Frontières envisioning a combined loss of more than  just in the month of April.

Other indices
The pandemic also affected the goal of the Philippines to be among the countries with upper-middle-income country status by nominal GNI per capita. Before his resignation, Pernia said that the country will still achieve this goal by 2020, while his replacement, acting NEDA Director-General Karl Kendrick Chua, said in May 2020 that this goal will be achieved in 2022. Daniel Ross of Bloomberg also stated that the Philippines, which is "an economic star poised to outpace long-time regional winners such as China, Indonesia and India," will face hindrances amid the COVID-19 pandemic.

On the other hand, the BSP recorded an inflation rate of 2.2% in April and 2.5% in March 2020 from 2.6% in February and 2.9% in January. The average rate of 2.6% for the period of January to April 2020 is also 1% lower compared to the inflation rate from the same period in the previous year. The event was primarily and hugely caused by lower oil prices and transportation costs, even if the prices of food supplies and alcoholic beverages and tobacco slightly rose.

On March 9, 2020, the Philippine Stock Exchange (PSE) index lost 457.77 points or 6.76%, its steepest decline since the financial crisis of 2007–08. The mining and oil industries were the most affected with a 9.05% drop, followed by holding companies with a 6.93% drop. The PSE's circuit breaker mechanism was invoked for the second time since the measure's introduction in 2008 halting trade for 15 minutes.

Economist Bernardo Villegas noted that pandemic has created a situation where the Philippine government "is getting overborrowed," and that the Philippines needs more foreign direct investments in order to fund capital-intensive industries, including telecommunications and media.

Employment 

In terms of unemployment rate, the Philippine Statistics Authority (PSA) records an estimated unemployment rate of 5.3% in January 2020, which is the same with January 2019. Moody's Analytics puts its estimate at 5.3% for the first quarter of 2020, while Nomura expects 7.5% for Q1 and a 13-year high of 8% in Q2 of this year. Meanwhile, the IMF stated that the unemployment rate in the country would be 6.2% for this year compared to 5.1% in 2019. A higher rate of 6.8% for this year was also predicted by S&P Global Ratings.

The Trade Union Congress of the Philippines estimated that around 7,000 people may lose jobs within the first half of 2020 due to the pandemic. Economists from the Ateneo de Manila University estimated that 57% of the country's workforce may be displaced within the end of the first quarter of 2020. It comprises around 15 million workers in Luzon that were laid off due to the enhanced community quarantine, around four million of whom are based in Metro Manila, as well as an estimated 4.3 million workers in Visayas and another 4.3 million in Mindanao that were laid off due to quarantine restrictions.

In March, the Department of Labor and Employment (DOLE) stated that 1.05 million workers were displaced due to the pandemic, even after they released guidelines for employers in handling the impact of COVID-19.

Philippine aviation services were heavily affected after travel, both locally and internationally, was restricted to contain the spread of the virus.

Some German businesses that are based in the country also reported to reduce investments in the country, but will continue to maintain their employees.

In early 2021, there were reports that some employers are requiring its workers to get vaccinated before allowing them to physically report for work, with some workers threatened to be placed on floating status if they are not able to comply. DOLE released a statement that such practice is illegal and workers should be only vaccinated on a voluntary basis.

The onset of the COVID-19 pandemic disproportionately impacted female employment, but the Philippines' past efforts to reduce gender inequalities mitigated the negative impact of female employment and educational opportunities.

Food service and supply

Services 
Following directives from the Philippine government, several fast food and restaurant chains suspended dine-in services and restricted operations to take-out and delivery. Online food ordering services such as GrabFood and Foodpanda temporarily halted during the enhanced community quarantine but eventually resumed operations in Luzon during the quarantine period.

Several restaurants and coffee shops across the country offered free food and beverages to front line professionals involved in the pandemic, especially health care workers.

Production and distribution 
Food production and distribution slowed down during the pandemic, especially in Luzon, primarily due to the lack of financial assistance and inaccessibility of transportation resulting from community quarantine measures being implemented across numerous local governments. The delivery of fresh vegetables from the province of Benguet, which supplies the country with over 80 percent of the country's highland vegetable requirements, was halted due to the implementation of an "extreme enhanced" community quarantine in La Trinidad. Local government officials advised local rice farmers to sell their harvests to them, assuring them that they would help distribute it to their respective communities amid the border restrictions.

On March 27, Vietnam announced that it would reduce its production and exportation of rice due to food security amid the pandemic. The Philippines, the largest importer of rice in the world, imports 25% of its rice from Vietnam. Agriculture Secretary William Dar assured that there would be "no shortage of the staple during the duration of the enhanced community quarantine and beyond" as "harvest [is] already coming in." Dar also stated the Department of Agriculture's plans to initiate early planting in the Cagayan Valley and Central Luzon, two of the largest rice producers in the country, ahead of the third quarter of 2020.

Production of canned fish in the country was adversely affected with Zamboanga City, which accounts for 85% of the country's canned fish industry, announcing it would reduce the production of canned fish in the Philippines by 50–60% due to difficulties encountered following the implementation of a city-wide lockdown.

Gambling 
The Philippine Amusement and Gaming Corporation (PAGCOR) ordered the suspension of all gaming operations in the country, including the land-based casinos in Entertainment City and Newport City, on March 15. The gaming regulator also announced that they were limiting the operations of Philippine offshore gaming operations in the region.

Illegal gambling activities conducted online, including online cockfighting or e-sabong, through social media has proliferated amidst the pandemic. PAGCOR has aimed to regulate online cockfighting, as part of efforts to expand the source of funds for the government.

Medical supply 

A shortage of medical masks was reported in various parts of the country due to concerns over the pandemic. RITM director Celia Carlos urged the public against hoarding masks to ensure ample supply for medical workers directly dealing with patients suspected or confirmed to have COVID-19 infection. The Department of Trade and Industry (DTI), in cooperation with the Philippine National Police, are acting against reports of traders hoarding face masks and selling said item at an overpriced rate. The DTI has also directed its Philippine International Trading Corp. to import 5 million masks from overseas. Medtecs International Corp. Ltd., the sole manufacturer of medical mask in the country, has committed to supply the government through the DTI. However, due of the Philippine procurement law, local manufacturers are having difficulty competing with foreign suppliers that have a lower cost but may have substandard quality.

Doctors in the Philippines have deplored the shortages in personal protective equipment amid the pandemic, and was even cited as the cause of high infection rate and death rate of healthcare workers in the country. To address this issue, the Philippine government continues to procure and stockpile such equipment, as the pandemic is expected to last until 2021.

According to Health Undersecretary Maria Rosario Vergeire, the country also issued requests for ventilators and respirators that will be used for severe or critical COVID-19 patients, as there are reported shortages of these equipment.

Retail 

According to the Philippine Retailers Association, the "total retail environment" saw a decline of 30–50%. SM Investments, the country's largest retailer, saw a decline of 10–20% in domestic sales. Despite the decline, most retail stores that provide essential services, including supermarkets, convenience stores, hardware stores, and pharmacies, remained open across the country to sustain consumers while other establishments at malls closed down. Such retail stores, however, imposed strict social distancing measures with some supermarkets only allowing 50 customers inside at a time and placing stickers on the floor to indicate that customers must stand one meter apart from each other. Stores were also regularly disinfected and customers were required to undergo a temperature check before entering. In the Greater Manila Area, several online grocers continued to operate, but with limited delivery slots. After most industries in the country being closed for two months, many stores in the retail sector are already allowed to open under revised guidelines of eased community quarantines.

Panic buying and hoarding became rampant across the country, especially with essential goods such as food and sanitation products. The Philippine Amalgamated Supermarkets Association reported that the purchases of masks, alcohol, and other personal hygiene products in supermarkets across the country had already surged, urging the public against panic buying.

Economic think-tank Fitch Solutions forecasts that the consumer and retail sector, especially non-essential businesses, would be one of the hardest-hit sectors in the Philippines as it loses sales revenue for an entire month due to the Luzon enhanced community quarantine (Luzon accounts for 73% of the country's GDP). Fitch Solutions forecasts the household final consumption expenditure for the country in 2020 to expand by 6.7% year-over-year, which was adjusted from a "pre-coronavirus projection" for 2020 of 7% growth year-over-year.

Mall operators across the country, such as Ayala, Megaworld, SM, Robinsons, and Vista, initially shortened the operating hours of its malls to comply with government quarantine measures. While doing so, malls were asked to implement social distancing measures; for example, several malls implemented a "single-seat gap" policy in cinemas, in which moviegoers were required to sit one seat apart from each other. However, most malls in the country have since limited its operations to establishments providing essential services, particularly groceries, banks, and hardware stores.

Travel 

Local airlines AirAsia, Philippine Airlines, and Cebu Pacific suspended flights in response to the imposition of travel bans by the Philippine government and some foreign governments. The airlines have suspended flights as early as February 2, 2020, covering routes involving destinations in China, Hong Kong, and Macau. At least Philippine Airlines has suspended all of its flights by March 2020, although the airline has announced plans to resume selected flights by June 1, 2020.

Social impact

Census 

The 2020 census of population and housing in the Philippines was originally scheduled in May but was postponed indefinitely due to the increasing number of cases in the country. As the quarantine measures began to ease, the Philippine Statistics Authority (PSA) started to conduct the census in September, despite the risk of spreading the virus.

Education

2019–20 academic year 
Suspension of classes began as early as March 2020 in response to the COVID-19 pandemic. On March 16, the Department of Education (DepEd) issued guidelines prohibiting public schools in areas with suspended classes from administering the final examinations of students and instead compute the students' final grades for the 2019–20 academic year based on "their current academic standing." and directed schools in other areas to administer final examinations within that week on a "staggered basis" and for teachers and students to observe social distancing measures.

Some universities resorted to implementing online learning alternatives. The Commission on Higher Education (CHED) also advised institutions of higher education to implement distance education methods of learning for its classes, such as the use of educational technology, to maximize the academic term despite the suspensions; However, following the announcement of the enhanced community quarantine in Luzon and other areas, colleges and universities suspended mandatory online classes in consideration of the welfare of its students, faculty, and staff. Academic administration offices continued to operate with a skeleton crew, while other offices in colleges and universities operated via remote work arrangements. Some schools, however, continued to hold online classes, and in response, several student groups appealed to CHED to suspend mandatory online classes in consideration of the logistical limitations and well-being of a majority of students.

Live classes in all levels across the country were eventually suspended due to the pandemic. Graduation rites in Philippine schools were also either canceled, postponed, or held virtually.

The procedure for automatic class suspensions in connection to the typhoon warning signals by PAGASA remained in effect even as classes were held in distance learning setup.

2020–21 academic year 
The official start of classes for the 2020–21 school year could only be legally set as late as the last day of August. However, Republic Act No. 11480 was signed into law to allow the start of classes to be set beyond August. The Department of Education has moved the opening of classes to October 5, 2020. Earlier in June, officials reported that schools will not open until a vaccine is available, though remote learning should resume at the end of August. A group of UP experts has proposed the start of classes to be pushed back to December in order to limit the spread of the disease.

CHED left the decision of starting semesters to college administrators, although urged them to shift into the new semestral calendar and start 'flexible classes' in August and face-to-face classes in September as well. Certain measures have been proposed to be implemented during the opening of classes, such as the airing of lectures on television and radio, a "mandatory face mask policy," maintaining physical distancing, and limiting class sizes.

Re-allowing of face-to-face classes 
According to the UNICEF, the Philippines is among the last countries to re-allow the conduct of face-to-face classes with the only other country to yet allow live classes being Venezuela as of September 2021. On November 5, 2021, CHED allowed colleges to conduct face-to-face classes at 50 percent capacity in campuses in localities under alert level 2 under certain conditions, such as a high vaccination rate among students and faculty and classrooms retrofitted. The DepEd will also be conducting a pilot run of face-to-face classes in 100 public schools starting November 15, 2021. Also the DepEd will be conducting a pilot run of face-to-face classes in 20 private schools starting November 22, 2021.

Tourism 
Over 5,200 flights covering two months, which was to be serviced by member airlines of the Air-Carriers Association of the Philippines, were canceled. Europe Solidaire Sans Frontières also reported potential damage in Philippine tourism.

The National Museum of the Philippines temporarily closed its complex in Manila and all branch museums throughout the country.

The Philippine Shopping Festival, a nationwide mall sale event backed by the Department of Tourism originally scheduled on March 1–31, 2020, was postponed due to the COVID-19 pandemic. Several local festivals across the country were also either canceled or postponed due to the ongoing COVID-19 pandemic.

Prisons 

The impact of COVID-19 in prisons in the Philippines is projected to be "dangerous," since its jails have the highest occupancy rate in the world that stands at 534%. The Bureau of Jail Management and Penology has temporarily suspended the acceptance of visitors in prisons it manages as early as March 2020, encouraging would-be visitors to avail the e-dalaw service which would allow inmates to communicate with relatives online.

Certain human rights groups raised their concerns on the issue. Human Rights Watch flagged the cases of dying inmates in prison cells and called for the freedom of minor offenders, the elderly, and the ill. Karapatan and KAPATID both called for the release of political prisoners that belongs to vulnerable sector as a way to decongest Philippine jails amidst COVID-19 pandemic.

A group of 22 high-risk prisoners (either of old age, immunocompromised, or pregnant) also asked for temporary liberty due to 'humanitarian grounds' since "hellish prison conditions in the Philippines make the detainees vulnerable to COVID-19." All of the 22 prisoners, five of which are consultants of New Peoples' Army (NPA), are asking to be allowed to post bail or to be released under personal recognizance. They are represented by Public Interest Law Center (PILC) and the National Union of People's Lawyers (NUPL). Similarly, one of the suspects in the death of Horacio "Atio" Castillo III pleaded for freedom under the guise of the COVID-19's threat.

In mid-April, the Supreme Court (SC) reiterated its 2014 circular, which allows the temporary freedom of "persons deprived of liberty" who were able to serve their minimum penalty during an ongoing trial or those whose trial are paused due to lack of witnesses. Chief Justice Diosdado Peralta and Justice Secretary Menardo Guevarra also signed resolutions that relaxes bail prices for indigent inmates and requirements to avail parole and executive clemency. On May 2, Associate Justice Mario Victor Leonen announced that there were 9,731 detainees released temporarily by the SC from March 17 to April 29 as a way to alleviate the country's overcrowding prisons.

Entertainment and media 

The DOH issued an advisory for the cancellation of large public events and mass gatherings, such as concerts, until further notice to minimize the risk of spreading the disease. This prompted several local and international artists to either cancel or postpone their scheduled concerts and fan meets.

Local television networks temporarily stopped admitting live audiences for their television shows, including variety shows Eat Bulaga! on GMA Network as well as It's Showtime and ASAP on ABS-CBN. On March 13, both ABS-CBN and GMA announced that they would suspend productions on their drama shows as well as other entertainment programs by March 15, replacing affected programs with reruns of previous series or extended newscast runs.

Broadcast radio companies are also curtailing their operations during the quarantine period, either by shortening their broadcast hours and/or suspending regular programming in favor of "special broadcasts".

Media watchdogs noted that during the COVID-19 pandemic in the Philippines, free speech and press freedom were subject to increased legal and administrative restrictions. In 2021, during the commemoration of World Press Freedom Day, the Committee to Protect Journalists said that harassment, arrests, and killings of journalists by agents of the state continued during the pandemic.

Religion 

The Roman Catholic Church in the Philippines issued preventive guidelines against the pandemic through the Catholic Bishops' Conference of the Philippines (CBCP). In January 2020, the CBCP issued a liturgical guideline which urges Mass attendees to "practice ordinarily" the receiving of communion by hand, and avoid holding hands while praying the Lord's Prayer during Mass. As a spiritual measure against the spread of the disease, the CBCP also composed an oratio imperata (obligatory prayer) which is to be recited during Mass. In February 2020, the CBCP issued a second liturgical guideline in anticipation of the Lenten season. The bishops suggested that during Ash Wednesday, ashes would be sprinkled on the faithfuls' head instead of the customary marking of the forehead with a cross to minimize body contact. The CBCP also urged people to refrain from kissing or touching the cross for veneration during Good Friday, particularly the celebration of the Passion of Jesus. They suggested genuflection or bowing as an alternative to the practice. Dioceses across the country have suspended the public celebration of Masses. On April 8, Holy Wednesday, the CBCP organized an interfaith prayer service against the spread of the coronavirus, which was televised nationwide.

Other Christian denominations and organizations, such as the Iglesia ni Cristo and the Jehovah's Witnesses, have suspended live worship services and resorted to organizing worship services through online platforms. The Philippine Council of Evangelical Churches, an organization composed of Evangelical and Protestant church member organizations in the country, also adopted similar measures.

The Church of Jesus Christ of Latter-day Saints directed missionaries assigned in the Philippines who are not native to the country to move out for temporary reassignment to another country. They were ordered to self-quarantine in their new homes for 14 days.

The Islamic community in the Philippines has also adopted measures against COVID-19. The Regional Darul Ifta' of Bangsamoro suspended all congregational prayers in the Bangsamoro region from March 19 to April 10.

Sports 

Several ongoing or scheduled seasons of sports leagues in the Philippines, such as the ASEAN Basketball League, Maharlika Pilipinas Basketball League, Philippine Basketball Association, National Basketball League, Philippines Football League, and Philippine Super Liga, were suspended. Upcoming sporting competitions hosted by the country, specifically the Badminton Asia Championships (initially scheduled to be hosted in Wuhan but was moved to Manila) and the AFF Women's Championship, were postponed. Regional qualification games involving Philippine national teams were likewise postponed.

On April 29, 2020, the Philippine Sports Commission have announced that they will cancel all of their sporting events until December 2020 to comply with government directives that prohibit mass gathering events. This meant that the Palarong Pambansa in Marikina, the Philippine National Games, and the ASEAN Para Games were all cancelled.

Elections 
The Commission on Elections has suspended the nationwide voter registration on March 10 until the end of the month due to the COVID-19 pandemic. The registration period began on January 20, 2020, and is scheduled to run until September 30, 2021. The suspension was later extended to last until the end of April. The issuance of voter's certification is also suspended until further notice. The next national elections scheduled in the Philippines are in May 2022. The plebiscite to ratify legislation that proposes the partition of Palawan into three smaller provinces scheduled for May 2020 was also delayed due to the pandemic.

Misinformation and hoaxes 

After the initial outbreak of the COVID-19 pandemic in the Philippines, conspiracy theories, misinformation, and disinformation emerged online regarding the origin, scale, prevention, treatment, and various other aspects of the disease.

The DOH has advised against spreading misinformation and unverified claims concerning the pandemic. The Philippine National Police on their part has taken action against the spread of misinformation related to the pandemic and has warned the public that misinformation purveyors could be charged for violating Presidential Decree no. 90 for "declaring local rumor, mongering and spreading false information". In the case of misinformation circulated online, violators could be charged for violating the Cybercrime Prevention Act which has a maximum penalty of imprisonment for 12 years.

Statistics 
The DOH publishes official numbers through its daily case bulletins at 4:00 pm (PhST).

By region

By demographic 
In the table below, the general lethality of COVID-19 in the Philippines is presently given around %, implying around 2 deaths and 98 potential survivors per 100 cases. To compare the three well-known coronavirus diseases, the case fatality rate of the 2002 severe acute respiratory syndrome (SARS) outbreak was higher at 11%, while that of the 2012 Middle East respiratory syndrome (MERS) outbreak was much higher at 36%.

Progression charts

Notes

See also 
 2009 swine flu pandemic in the Philippines
 2019–2021 polio outbreak in the Philippines
 2019 measles outbreak in the Philippines

References

External links 

 COVID-19 Dashboard (Laging Handa) – an online portal by the government of the Philippines
 COVID-19 Tracker  – a case and situation tracker by the Department of Health (DOH)
 EndCOV PH  – a case and situation tracker by the UP Resilience Institute (UPRI)
 LGU vs COVID PH – an online portal for local government units (LGUs)

 
Philippines
COVID-19 pandemic
COVID-19 pandemic
COVID-19 pandemic
Disease outbreaks in the Philippines
Philippines
Presidency of Rodrigo Duterte
Presidency of Bongbong Marcos